Eliot Kid is an animated children's television series composed of two seasons and 104 episodes produced by Samka Productions, Safari de Ville, and CBBC. The series was directed by Gilles Cazaux. Lead voices and voice direction for both seasons were conducted by animation voice director, Matthew Géczy. The French version for both seasons was conducted by Kris Bénard.

The show is about a young boy, who summons up blockbuster film scenarios from his imagination to challenge and inspire his friends.

Characters
The voice cast consists of Barbara Scaff, Mike No Name Nelson, and Mirabelle Kirkland, with Alistair Abell, Leslie Lanker, Christine Flowers, Jodi Forrest, and Matthew Geczy also starring.

Kid family
Eliot Kid, the little kid with an overactive imagination that turns the most commonplace situations into Hollywood action-adventure blockbusters, voiced by Barbara Scaff
Isabelle Kid, Eliot's mother and mayor of the city Voiced by Mirabelle Kirkland
Jeremy Kid, Eliot's father who loves to invent things Voiced by Matthew Gezcy
Suzie Kid, Eliot's older sister Voiced by Leslie Lanker

Eliot's friends
Kaytoo Voiced by Jodi Forrest
Mimi voiced by Christine Flowers

School staff
Mr. Leon, Eliot's school principal Voiced by Matthew Geczy
Ms. Brigitte, Eliot's teacher Voiced by Mirabelle Kirkland

Catherine Jacob dubbed Brigitte (the teacher) for the first season. Marion Game gave her voice to the character for the second season.

Others
Max, Eliot's Rival
Loretta, a girl who is in love with Eliot
Jade, a babysitter who babysits anyone like Eliot 
Victor, a boy in glasses
Michael, a boy who is fat and wearing overalls
Marcus, a boy who always wears his coat
Mimi's mother, a tall easygoing woman
Mimi's father, a short short-tempered man who always gets annoyed
Sierra, an Asian girl with black hair and short pigtails
Youki, a young timid Japanese boy who is almost an alien

Episodes

Season 1

Season 2

References

External links
 

2000s British animated television series
2000s French animated television series
2008 British television series debuts
2008 French television series debuts
2009 British television series endings
2009 French television series endings
Animated television series about children
British children's animated adventure television series
British children's animated comedy television series
British flash animated television series
English-language television shows
French-language television shows
French children's animated adventure television series
French children's animated comedy television series
French flash animated television series
British surreal comedy television series